Placenta expressed transcript 1 is a protein that in humans is encoded by the PLET1 gene.

References

Further reading